Áron Csongvai (born 31 October 2000) is a Hungarian football midfielder who plays for OTP Bank Liga club Fehérvár.

Club career
On 14 February 2023, Csongvai signed a three-year contract with Fehérvár.

Career statistics

References

External links
 
 

2000 births
Footballers from Budapest
21st-century Hungarian people
Living people
Hungarian footballers
Hungary under-21 international footballers
Association football midfielders
Újpest FC players
Vác FC players
Fehérvár FC players
Nemzeti Bajnokság I players
Nemzeti Bajnokság II players